Netta Aloni (Hebrew: נטע אלוני; born 1945) is a contemporary Israeli composer who composes for vocal and instrumental ensembles. He has written chamber, choral and instrumental works for both solo and group performers.

Formal education
Aloni studied musical composition with the Israeli composer Andre Hajdu, and continued his studies with  Reuven Sarrousy, Betty Oliviero and Gideon Levinson, also Israeli composers. He took supplementary courses in composition during 2005-2007 at the Bar-Ilan University, Israel.

Performances and awards
Aloni's work is performed in Israel and abroad. His compositions were recorded by the Israeli Broadcasting Authority and were broadcast over the radio, on the Voice of Music station in Israel, which is devoted to broadcasting both classic and contemporary classical music by foreign and Israeli composers. His work I Have Told Myself Completely was chosen to represent the Israel Broadcasting Authority in the International Rostrum of Composers. He is one of six recipients of the 2013 Composition by Classical Composers Award sponsored by the Ministry of Culture and Sport and given by the Israeli Prime Minister.

Published work
Four full-length CDs of Netta Aloni compositions have been published: 

 Moments with Myself (1996), with compositions for piano and flute performed by Israelis Ora Rotem-Nelken and  Edith Shemer on the respective instruments
 Five Vocal Pieces(2000), with pieces sung by Mira Zakai accompanied by Rotem-Nelken, and pieces for voice and instrumental ensemble sung by Esti Keinan and Avital Raz
 Breathless (2007), pieces composed exclusively for the bayan
  The Empty Rooms (2012), a double album collecting his compositions from the years 1999-2012, including
 a string quintet
 two song cycles for voice and piano
 chamber compositions for violin and piano, cello and bayan, and solo pieces. 
The works were recorded at the Jerusalem Music Center in Mishkenot Sha'ananim during the year 2012.
 The Day After (2017), a double album collecting compositions from the years 2014-2017, including
 two pieces for choir
 pieces for solo piano
 a wind quintet
 pieces for cello, contrabass and bayan
 two song cycles for voice, piano and bayan
The works were recorded at the Tel-Aviv conservatory during the year 2017.

Personal 

Aloni lives with his family in Jerusalem, and he is also a practicing psychoanalyst.

External links
 Netta Aloni's Composer Page where many of his works can be listened to in streaming audio
 Netta Aloni's YouTube channel
 A full length video of a performance of "3 songs for Choir" (2017)

Israeli composers
1945 births
Living people